I Will Sing is an album of contemporary worship music recorded by Don Moen. Recorded live in the CBN studios in Virginia Beach, Virginia, the album was produced by Paul Mills, and includes the vocals by Lenny LeBlanc and guitar by Chris Rodriguez. The album also includes narrations that contain Bible verses. The video and the DVD are the same recording of this album.

Conception
Moen's preceding albums have been recorded in front of large audiences, particularly God Is Good – Worship with Don Moen, which was recorded with an audience of 7000 worshippers. However, for I Will Sing, Moen decided to record an album with only a small number of worshippers. Speaking on this, he said, You hear a lot about mega-churches, but most people worship in small churches. My heart goes out to music directors who hear our CDs and think, "That sounds great, but we've got 85 people in our church."

Moen thus decided to record an album to encourage other worship leaders to lead worship in front of small audiences.I Will Sing was recorded with only 70 local worshippers.

Moen described the experience as being the "second most powerful worship experience [he had] ever had".

Song inspiration
The title track of the album, I Will Sing, was written by Moen. It was written while Moen was in his car at one of Alabama's gulf coast beaches, trying to write songs for his upcoming album. He had been having a frustrating day, and the lyrics he wrote demonstrated his feelings. However, he did not like the lyrics. He said,I didn't feel anything the entire day. It was one of those times when you wonder where God is. I was driving back home, feeling frustrated, and I said, "Lord, You seem so far away, a million miles or more it feels today." It just popped out. Then I got another line: "And though I haven't lost my faith, I must confess right now that it's hard for me to pray." The words kept coming, and I wrote the entire song right there in my car, but I didn't like it. I thought, "What a waste! I need songs for the album; I don't need this!" Moen did not plan to use the song, thinking that he would "never put it on a Hosanna! Music album".

Later, he found out about the death of David C. Reilly's daughter. Reilly had been designing album covers for Integrity Music for more than a decade. Moen then recorded the song on a CD and sent it to David, with an encouragement. The note he attached to Reilly said,
I know you're going to have days when you feel like, "Where in the world is God?" but I want to encourage you to sing. Don't give up.

It was then that Moen discovered the value of the song, realizing that God wanted his people to be "honest before the Lord".

Track listing
"Our Father Overture" – 01:23
"Our Father" – 05:52
"Lift Up Your Heads" – 04:34
"Sing For Joy" – 04:06
"River Of Love" – 04:34
"Two Hands, One Heart" – 04:07
"Glory To The Lord" – 04:39
"As We Worship You" – 07:34
"Here We Are" – 04:37
"Have Your Way" – 02:14
"Like Eagles" – 05:29
"We Wait" – 05:18
"I Will Sing" – 06:02
"Narration"(Don Sharing) – 00:42
"Lord You Are Good" – 04:49
"Lord We've Come To Worship" – 05:10
IN TOTAL 71:10

Credits
Producer:
 Paul Mills

Executive Producers:
 Don Moen 
 Chris Thomason

Arrangers:
Lenny LeBlanc – Vocal Arrangement
 Michael Mellett – Vocal Arrangement
 Paul Mills – String Arrangements, Track Arrangement
Don Moen – Vocal Arrangement, Track Arrangement
Rachel Wilson – Vocal arrangement

Liner Notes:
 Michael Coleman

A&R Director:
 Chris Springer

Worship Leader:
 Don Moen

Musicians:
 Steve Brewster – Drums
 Mark Childers – Bass
 Carl Gorodetzky – String contractor
 Lenny LeBlanc – Acoustic guitar
 Ken Lewis – Percussion
 Blair Masters – Keyboards, Hammond organ
 Jerry McPherson – Acoustic Guitar, Electric guitar
 Paul Mills – Keyboards
 Don Moen – Piano
 Nashville String Machine – Strings
 Alberto Rivera – Keyboards
 Chris Rodriguez – Acoustic guitar, Electric guitar

Vocals: 
 Lenny LeBlanc – Vocals
 Michael Mellett – Vocals 
 Rachel Wilson – Vocals

Engineers
 Randy Adams – Engineer
 Paul Mills – Mixing
 Garrett Rockey – Engineer

References

Don Moen live albums
2000 live albums
Epic Records albums
2000 video albums
Live video albums